Ehringshausen is a municipality in the Lahn-Dill-Kreis in Hesse, Germany.

Geography

Location
Ehringshausen lies in the valley of the Dill between Wetzlar and Herborn.

Neighbouring communities
Ehringshausen borders in the north on the community of Mittenaar, in the east on the town of Aßlar, in the south on the towns of Solms and Leun, and in the northwest on the community of Sinn (all in the Lahn-Dill-Kreis).

Constituent communities
The community has nine centres named Breitenbach, Daubhausen, Dillheim, Dreisbach, Ehringshausen, Greifenthal, Katzenfurt, Kölschhausen and Niederlemp.

History
Ehringshausen had its first documentary mention in 802 in a donation document in the Lorsch codex. According to this document, Inric gave the Lorsch Monastery a fortified yard in the Barcdorfer Mark in the Lahngau. Barcdorf lay near today's Ehringshausen on the Dill's right bank. Whether it can be regarded as Ehringshausen's direct forerunner is, however, unclear.

The oldest centre in the community is, however, not the namesake centre, but rather Breitenbach, which had its first documentary mention in 778.

Politics
Ehringshausen was a stronghold of the extreme rightwing and nationalist National Democratic Party of Germany. For several decades, they have been represented on municipal council, even after the 2001 elections when their share of the vote fell from about 22% to 7.1%. In the 2006 municipal elections, they suffered a further setback when their share fell to only 4.9%. This still translated into two council seats.

Municipal council
The municipal elections on 27 March 2011 yielded the following results:

Note: FWG is a citizens' coalition.

Coat of arms
The two charges in the shield of Ehringshausen's civic coat of arms represent different aspects of the community's history, both dating back many centuries. The point, somewhat resembling a church steeple, stands for the local church, and the cogwheel for what was until 1956 the local industry – iron mining.

Partnerships
Ehringshausen maintains partnerships with the following places:
  Roquemaure, France since 28 April 1973
  Haverhill, United Kingdom since 16 April 1983
  Neustadt am Rennsteig, Thuringia since 11 May 1991

Transport
Through Ehringshausen run Autobahn A 45, with its Ehringshausen interchange, and the Siegen–Gießen railway line, with its Katzenfurt and Ehringshausen (Kr Wetzlar) stations. These are served hourly on workdays, and two-hourly Sundays and holidays by DB Regio Regionalbahn services between Dillenburg and Gießen.

Personalities
 Frank Paulus (1978-    ), German footballer
 Christoph Nix (1954-    ), jurisprudential scholar and theatre manager
 Dominik Stroh-Engel (1985-    ), German footballer
 Friedrich Weber (1949-    ), state bishop
 Gesa Felicitas Krause , athlete

References

External links
 Website Ehringshausen

Municipalities in Hesse
Lahn-Dill-Kreis